2006–07 season of Argentine football was the 116th season of competitive football in Argentina.

Torneo Apertura ("Opening" Tournament)

"Championship" playoff

Boca Juniors and Estudiantes de La Plata ended up tied in points at the end of the 19 weeks of regular season. Tournament rules establish that, unlike any other position on the table, if two or more teams are equal in points at the end of play, goal difference does not count and a playoff game is required. Estudiantes won that match and was crowned as champion.

Top scorers

Relegation

There is no relegation after the Apertura. For the relegation results of this tournament see below.

Torneo Clausura ("Closing" Tournament)

By matchday 8th, seven coaches were already fired by their respective teams

Top scorers

Relegation

"Promoción" playoff

Teams and schedules will be decided based on average after the end of the Closing tournament.

Tigre wins 3-1 and is promoted to Argentine First Division. While Nueva Chicago is relegated to the Argentine Nacional B.

Huracán wins 5-2 and is promoted to Argentine First Division. While Godoy Cruz is relegated to the Argentine Nacional B.

Lower leagues

Clubs in international competitions

National team
This section covers Argentina's matches from the end of the 2006 FIFA World Cup until the end of the 2007 Copa América.

Friendly matches

2007 Copa América

References

External links
 AFA
Argentina on FIFA.com
Argentina 2006–2007 by Juan Pablo Andrés at RSSSF.

 
Seasons in Argentine football